Sharav Nasanjargal (born 3 August 1968) is a Mongolian international footballer. He made his first appearance for the Mongolia national football team in 2007.

References

1968 births
Mongolian footballers
Mongolia international footballers
Living people
Association football goalkeepers